Golmayo is a surname. Notable people with the surname include:

Celso Golmayo Torriente (1879–1924), Cuban–Spanish chess master, son of Celso and brother of Manuel
Celso Golmayo Zúpide (1820–1898), Spanish–Cuban chess master
Manuel Golmayo Torriente (1883–1973), Cuban-Spanish chess master